Jean-Yves Esparon (born 8 August 1994) is a Seychellois sprinter. At the 2012 Summer Olympics, he competed in the Men's 200 metres.

References

External links

Seychellois male sprinters
1994 births
Living people
Olympic athletes of Seychelles
Athletes (track and field) at the 2012 Summer Olympics